Andreas John Ziegler (born April 14, 1999), better known under ring name A. J. Z., is an American professional wrestler and actor, currently wrestling for New Japan Pro-Wrestling and Control Your Narrative.

Early life 
Ziegler began working out in his parent's basement at nine years old. In 2010, he became a national freestyle skiing champion. He also won various bodybuilding titles as a teenager. In 2020, he graduated from Coastal Carolina University majoring in marketing.

Professional wrestling career

Training
In 2019, Ziegler graduated from Firestar Pro Wrestling, under Labron Kozone. He wrestles under the name "The Golden Boy" A. J. Z.. In 2019, he began working for Ohio Valley Wrestling. He performed for their live weekly television for two years. During his tenure at OVW, A. J. Z. feuded with many wrestlers including: Tony Gunn, Ryan Howe, Jay Bradley, and The Tate Twins. On October 22, 2019, he won the OVW Television Championship, and to this day is the final person to ever hold that title.  His final match at OVW was against Jessie Godderz for the National Heavyweight Championship.

Independent circuit
A. J. Z. also wrestles for AAW, Northeast Wrestling, and various other promotions. Over the years A. J. Z. has had numerous matches with former WWE Superstar Enzo Amore. He also was in a six man tag team match against the returning Big Cass for Impact Wrestling Plus.

NJPW and CYN (2021–present)
In 2021, Ziegler began working for NJPW Strong (TV Series). He debuted against Rocky Romero in a losing attempt. That match was known as his first mainstream appearance. His next appearance was in a match against Clark Connors. His last known appearance was at NJPW Autumn Attack. Most recently, A. J. Z. has signed with Control Your Narrative (CYN). A. J. Z. was a part of the first ever match, at the first ever CYN event, that was held in Orlando, Florida.

Championships and Accomplishments
Ohio Valley Wrestling
OVW Television Championship (1 time)

Bodybuilding and Skiing Championships

Bodybuilding
October 2015 WNBF
 1st Teens Class & 1sh Men's Middle-Weight
July 2017 Nationals
 5th Teen Light Heavy-Weight Bodybuilding
 2nd National Teen Physique
 1st National Teen Physique Class B

Skiing
USASA 
 4th in the Nation – Freestyle Skiing

Professional wrestling style and persona 
Ziegler's character is "The Golden Boy", an arrogant wrestler who thinks he is better than anyone else. In kayfabe, he is also presented as the nephew of WWE wrestler Dolph Ziggler.

References

External links 
 

Living people
Professional wrestlers from Wisconsin
1999 births
American male professional wrestlers
American bodybuilders
Freestyle skiers